Mark Frederickson is a retired American soccer player who spent eleven seasons in the Major Indoor Soccer League.

Youth
In 1978, Frederickson graduated from Bishop DuBourg High School where he is a member of the school's Hall of Fame.  That year, the Los Angeles Aztecs selected Frederickson in the North American Soccer League draft.  Frederickson chose to enter college rather than turn professional.  From 1978 to 1981, he played for St. Louis University, earning 1979 Honorable Mention and  1980 Second Team All American honors.  In 1995, St. Louis University inducted Frederickson into the Billikens Hall of Fame.

Professional
In 1982, the New York Cosmos picked Frederickson in the first round (thirteenth overall) of the NASL draft.  However, by that time, he was already playing for the Kansas City Comets of the Major Indoor Soccer League.  In 1985, Frederickson moved to the St. Louis Steamers.  On August 13, 1987, the Los Angeles Lazers signed Frederickson who had been waived by the Steamers.  In 1989, Frederickson made his last move, this time to the St. Louis Storm where he finished his career in 1992.

External links
 MISL stats

References

Living people
1960 births
Soccer players from St. Louis
American soccer players
Kansas City Comets (original MISL) players
Los Angeles Lazers players
Major Indoor Soccer League (1978–1992) players
St. Louis Steamers players
St. Louis Storm players
Saint Louis Billikens men's soccer players
Association football midfielders